Brecht Capon (born 22 April 1988) is a Belgian footballer who currently plays for KV Oostende.

Career
On 12 June 2009, he joined K.V. Kortrijk on loan from Club Brugge.

International career
Capon played at the 2007–09 International Challenge Trophy and scored the only goal in the final against hosts England.

References

External links
 
 
 

1988 births
Living people
Belgian footballers
Belgium under-21 international footballers
Belgium youth international footballers
Club Brugge KV players
K.V. Kortrijk players
K.V. Oostende players
Belgian Pro League players
Association football forwards